Asian Highway 78 (AH78) is a road in the Asian Highway Network running 1110 km (690 miles) from Ashgabat, Turkmenistan to Kerman, Iran. The route is as follows:

Turkmenistan
 Ashgabat - Chovdoan Pass

Iran
 : Bajgiran - Quchan - Sabzevar
 : Sabzevar - Bajestan
 : Bajestan - Ferdows - Kerman

References

External links 

 Iran road map on Young Journalists Club

Asian Highway Network

Roads in Turkmenistan
Roads in Iran